G.I. Joe: Valor vs. Venom is a 2004 American computer-animated military science fiction action film. The film is a sequel to G.I. Joe: Spy Troops (2003). It was released in 2004 by Reel FX Creative Studios and distributed by Paramount Home Entertainment. Like Spy Troops, the film was written around the theme of the toys released that year. In this case, it was Valor vs. Venom which introduced a new villain group, Cobra’s V-Troops.

Plot
Some time after Spy Troops, Cobra sends drones to the local zoo to take DNA from the alpha predators. G.I. Joe is called in by the zoo's vet, finding a tranquilizer dart left behind. Snake-Eyes grants his students Kamakara and Jinx swords for completing their training; though Kamakara's blade refuses to be drawn unless he is in the right mindset. At the same time the Joe's senior member, General Hawk is captured by Destro and the Baroness. At Cobra's arctic base, Doctor Mindbender reveals Cobra Commander's latest scheme: mutate (or "Venomize") humans into animalistic brainwashed troopers. But they need a good general; hence Hawk's abduction for the full Venomization process.

The Joes track down the base, just as Cobra Commander blasts Hawk with a DNA mixture; however it fails, due to the full process being incomplete. Cyborg commander of the B.A.T.s, Overkill, uses a device to scrabble Hawk's DNA with the samples, causing him to transform into "Venomous Maximus"; suppressing Hawk's memory. The Joes retreat after failing to bring Hawk back to his senses. However, Maximus is proving resistant to Cobra Commander's mind control scepter; a side-effect Mindbender warned could happen if too much alpha animal DNA was used.

Cobra relocates to a missile launching facility recently stolen from the Joe's by Slash and Slice's army of B.A.T.s and Venoms. Maximus strikes a partnership with Overkill, promising to reward him with equality and respect when he takes over Cobra. The Joes launch an attack to take back the base, having developed an antidote to cure the Venoms; forcing Maximus to mutiny earlier. Mindbender, not wanting the world to devolve under Maximus's animalistic rule, helps the Joes trap him in a magnetic field to assist the antidote in curing him. It doesn't work, until Cobra Commander attempts to kill Maximus and Duke with a missile.

The impact against the magnetic field sends the missile backwards into the base; at the same time curing Hawk. To Cobra Commander's exasperation, this starts a loop of missiles backfiring into the base, which buries Overkill and allows Mindbender and the rest of Cobra to escape. Captured by the Joes, Cobra Commander attempts to bribe his way out of custody, only to be shot down by the annoyed heroes.

Cast

Toys
Hasbro also released a Valor vs. Venom toyline in 2004, to correspond with the characters from the movie. A second wave of Valor vs. Venom figures was released in 2005.

The following 3 inch collection was to be called G.I. Joe: Robot Revolution, and would have featured the Joes against Cobra robots and cyborgs. That toyline would likely have had its own movie, as a sequel to Valor vs. Venom, but the toyline was replaced by the 8-inch G.I. Joe: Sigma 6 toyline in 2006. However, Sigma 6 also deals with cybernetically-enhanced Cobras.

References

External links
 
 Reel FX Creative Studios home page

2004 direct-to-video films
2004 films
2004 computer-animated films
2000s American animated films
G.I. Joe (franchise) animated films
American sequel films
American computer-animated films
Direct-to-video animated films
Reel FX Creative Studios films
Paramount Pictures direct-to-video films
Paramount Pictures animated films
Direct-to-video sequel films
Toonami
2000s English-language films